Aarno Raninen (27 April 1944 – 3 September 2014) was a Finnish singer, songwriter and musician. His main instrument was piano but he has also mastered violin, cello and accordion.

Born in Kotka, Raninen began his musical studies at a young age. After he moved to Helsinki in 1966 he got a job as a studio conductor at Musiikki-Fazer. While working there he made a lot of cooperative work with the likes of songwriter Juha Vainio. Later on Raninen went to work in Discophon where he wrote lyrics for many Finnish musicians, such as Seija Simola, Carola, Tauno Palo, Vesa-Matti Loiri, Monica Aspelund, Heikki Kinnunen, Arja Koriseva, Erkki Liikanen and the Soitinmenot-ensemble.

An important acquaintance for Raninen has been the songwriter for film and television, Pertti "Pertsa" Reponen.

Raninen and his work received several awards over the years, including the win at  1968 ("Näin on" performed by Kristian), 10th place at Eurovision in 1977 ("Lapponia" performed by Monica Aspelund) and the main prize at the Menschen und Meer competition in 1978 ("Silver and gold" performed by Monica Aspelund). He died in Tuusula in 2014.

References

1944 births
People from Kotka
2014 deaths
20th-century Finnish male singers
Deaths from fire
Accidental deaths in Finland